The men's single sculls competition at the 2013 Summer Universiade in Kazan took place the Kazan Rowing Centre.

Results

Heats

Heat 1

Heat 2

Heat 3

Repechage

Repechage Heat 1

Repechage Heat 2

Semifinals

Semifinal 1

Semifinal 2

Finals

Final C

Final B

Final A

References 

Rowing at the 2013 Summer Universiade